Heidi Thomson (born 1961) is a New Zealand academic, a full professor of English at the Victoria University of Wellington.

Academic career

After an undergraduate at the University of Ghent and a 1990  PhD titled  'The poetic self in the English ode, 1740–1820'  at the University of Illinois at Urbana-Champaign, Thomson moved to Victoria University of Wellington, rising to full professor.

Selected works 
 Fauske, Heidi Kaufman Christopher J. An uncomfortable authority: Maria Edgeworth and her contexts. University of Delaware Press, 2004.
 Thomson, Heidi. "We are two": The address to Dorothy in" Tintern Abbey." Studies in Romanticism 40, no. 4 (2001): 531–546.
 Dabundo, Laura. Encyclopedia of Romanticism (Routledge Revivals): Culture in Britain, 1780s–1830s. Routledge, 2009.
 Bloom, Abigail Burnham, ed. Nineteenth-century British women writers: a bio-bibliographical critical sourcebook. Greenwood Publishing Group, 2000.
 Thomson, Heidi. "Eavesdropping on" The Eve of St. Agnes": Madeline's Sensual Ear and Porphyro's Ancient Ditty." The Journal of English and Germanic Philology 97, no. 3 (1998): 337–351.
 Thomson, Heidi. "The Poet and the Publisher in Thomas Gray's Correspondence." The Yearbook of English Studies 28 (1998): 163–180.
 Heidi Thomson, Coleridge and the Romantic Newspaper: The "Morning Post" and the Road to "Dejection" (Basingstoke: Palgrave Macmillan, 2016)

References

External links
  
 

Living people
1961 births
New Zealand women academics
University of Illinois Urbana-Champaign alumni
Ghent University alumni
Academic staff of the Victoria University of Wellington